Landmarks is a studio album by Irish folk group Clannad. It was released in March 1998. A remastered recording was released 22 February 2005, by RCA Records. It includes a remix of "An Gleann" by Cantoma.

Landmarks garnered Clannad their first ever Grammy Award at the 1999 awards, for Best New Age Album, after two previous nominations.

Track listing

 "An Gleann" – 4:50
 "Fadó" – 5:17
 "A Mhuirnín Ó" – 4:59
 "Of This Land" – 4:45
 "Court to Love" – 3:51
 "Golden Ball" – 4:02
 "The Bridge of Tears" – 4:00
 "Autumn Leaves Are Falling" – 3:48
 "Let Me See" – 5:06
 "Loch na Caillí" – 3:08
 "An Gleann" (Cantoma Mix) (only on 2005 reissue album) – 6:53

Charts

Singles
 "An Gleann"

References

External links
 This album at Northern Skyline

1998 albums
Clannad albums
Grammy Award for Best New Age Album
RCA Records albums